Nanjing Road (also called 7th Blvd) is a major arterial in Taipei, Taiwan, connecting the Datong district in the west with the Zhongshan and Songshan districts in the east. Nanjing Road is known for heavy traffic channeling from the MacAuthur Bridge into central Taipei.  There are bus lanes and platforms in the middle of the roadway to facilitate transit on the roadway. Underground MRT line runs under Nanjing Road for most of the corridor.

Major intersections
 Zhongshan Road
 Linsen Road
 Xinsheng Road
 Jianguo Road
 Fuxing Road
 Dunhua Road
 Jiankang Road
 Guangfu Road
 Sanmin Road
 Tayou Road, Keelung Road

See also

 List of roads in Taiwan

Streets in Taipei